Kamrup Rural district, or simply Kamrup district (Pron: ˈkæmˌrəp or ˈkæmˌru:p), is an administrative district in the state of Assam in India formed by dividing the old Kamrup district into two in the year 2003; other being Kamrup Metropolitan district, named after the region it constitutes. This district, along with Nalbari, Barpeta, Kamrup Metropolitan, Bajali and Baksa districts has been created from the Undivided Kamrup district.

History

Kamrup Rural district was created by bifurcating Undivided Kamrup district in 2003.

The Government of Assam, during the Chief-ministership of Late Tarun Gogoi, had proposed to bifurcate it further and create a new district, named South Kamrup. In 2016, the process of creation of the district was started. However, later that year, the process of creation was stopped midway due to lack of infrastructure.

Geography and environment

Overview
Kamrup district has some territorial disputes with neighbouring West Khasi Hills district, Meghalaya, including that over the village of Langpih.

Hydrography
In the immediate neighborhood of the Brahmaputra, the land is low and exposed to annual inundation. In this marshy tract reeds and canes flourish luxuriantly, and the only cultivation is that of rice. At a comparatively short distance from the river banks the ground begins to rise in undulating knolls towards the mountains of Bhutan on the north, and towards the Khasi hills on the south. The Brahmaputra, which divides the district into two nearly equal portions, is navigable by river steamers throughout the year, and receives several tributaries navigable by large native boats in the rainy season. The chief of these are the Manas, Chaul Khoya and Barnadi on the north, and the Kulsi and Dibru on the south bank.

Flora and fauna
There is also a plantation where seedlings of teak, sal, sissu, sum, and nahor are reared, and experiments are being made with the caoutchouc tree.

Kamrup is home to one of the few large colonies of greater adjutant storks still in existence. The villagers previously regarded the birds as pests, but outreach efforts including cultural and religious programming, especially aimed at local women, have rallied Kamrup residents to be proud of and protect the storks.

Demographics
According to the 2011 census Kamrup district has a population of 1,517,542, roughly equal to the West African country of Gabon or the US state of Hawaii. This gives it a ranking of 327th in India (out of a total of 640). Its population growth rate over the decade 2001-2011 was 15.67%. Kamrup has a sex ratio of 946 females for every 1000 males, and a literacy rate of 72.81%. Scheduled Castes and Scheduled Tribes made up 7.11% and 12.00% of the population respectively.

Religion

 
The religious composition of the district includes Hinduism (877,495) 57.82% majority, second most popular is Islam numbering (601,784) constituting 39.66% of the region and rest 2.52% include others religions like Sikhism , Christianity , Buddhism, Jainism and indigenous tribal religions according to census 2011 report. The district has people belonging to various indigenous Assamese communities like Keots/Kaibarta, Bodo, Rabha, Tiwa/Lalung, Amri Karbi, Dom/Nadiyal, Koch-Rajbongshi etc.

Religious important places
The district has followers of Hinduism, Islam, Christianity, Buddhism and Animism. The ancient temples of Kamakhya and Hajo attracts many pilgrims from all quarters. The people of Kamrup also donated a sacred Arya Avalokiteśvara statue to Stakna Monastery in Ladakh.

Language

Major language spoken natively is Kamrupi dialect of Assamese with pockets of Amri, a language related with Karbi, with 1,30,000 speakers; Tiwa (Lalung) and A'Tong, also  spoken by 10,000 people, found mostly in southern parts bordering Meghalaya. Rabha is spoken by some along the Meghalaya border. All the indigenous Assamese communities use Assamese to communicate with other indigenous Assamese communities.

According to the 2011 census, 74.43% of the population spoke Assamese, 19.90% Bengali, 1.86% Garo, 1.41% Boro and 1.17% Hindi as their first language.

Economy

The staple crop of the district is rice, of which there are three crops. The indigenous manufactures are confined to the weaving of silk and cotton cloths for home use, and to the making of brass cups and plates. The chief exports are rice, oilseeds, timber, and cotton; the imports are fine rice, salt, piece goods, sugar, betel nuts, coconuts, and hardware. A section of the Assam-Bengal railway starts from Guwahati and a branch of the Eastern Bengal railway has recently been opened to the opposite bank of the river. A metalled road runs due south from Guwahati to Shillong.

Villages
 

Hahara

See also
 Silsako
 Madan Kamdev
 Kamrup region

References

Bibliography

External links
 District Administration website

 Note: Kamrup Metropolitan district is completely surrounded by Kamrup Rural district. 

 
Kamrup region
Districts of Assam
2003 establishments in Assam